Adolfo Romero Quiñones (4 December 1922 – died before 1999) was a Mexican cyclist. He competed in the time trial and the sprint events at the 1948 Summer Olympics.

References

External links
 

1922 births
Year of death missing
Mexican male cyclists
Olympic cyclists of Mexico
Cyclists at the 1948 Summer Olympics
Place of birth missing